Three Men on Fire AKA Terror Force Commando is a 1986 Italian movie directed by Richard Harrison. It stars Richard Harrison, Alphonse Beni, Romano Kristoff and Gordon Mitchell.

The plot is about Inspector Baiko, a Cameroonese police officer (Alphonse Beni) who has learnt that Italian terrorists led by a man called "Zero" (Romano Kristoff) are planning to murder the Pope during his African tour in Cameroon. He then goes investigate in Rome with a CIA agent (Richard Harrison).

External links

Nanarland review Short review by B-movie amateurs

1986 films
Italian action thriller films
1980s crime films
Films shot in Cameroon
Films set in Cameroon
1980s Italian films